Aethaloida is a monotypic moth genus in the family Geometridae erected by James Halliday McDunnough in 1920. Its only species, Aethaloida packardaria, was first described by George Duryea Hulst in 1888. It is found in the US state of California.

References

Nacophorini
Geometridae genera
Monotypic moth genera